The following elections occurred in 1962.

Africa

 Algerian independence referendum 
 1962 Chadian parliamentary election 
 Gambian legislative election
 Northern Rhodesian general election
 Southern Rhodesian general election
 Federation of Rhodesia and Nyasaland election
 Sierra Leonean general election
 presidential election in Tanganyika (later Tanzania) 
 1962 Ugandan general election

Asia
 1962 Bruneian general election
 1962 North Korean parliamentary election
 1962 Singaporean national referendum
 1962 Japanese House of Councillors election

India
 1962 Indian general election
 1951–1971 Indian general elections
 Indian general election in Andhra Pradesh, 1962
 Indian general election in Madras, 1962
 1962 Indian presidential election
 1962 Madras State legislative assembly election
 1962 West Bengal state assembly election

Europe
 1962 Albanian parliamentary election
 1962 Finnish parliamentary election
 1962 Maltese general election

Austria
 1962 Austrian legislative election

France
 1962 French legislative election
 1962 French presidential election referendum
 1962 French Évian Accords referendum

United Kingdom
 1962 Blackpool North by-election
 1962 Chippenham by-election
 1962 South Dorset by-election
 1962 Lincoln by-election
 1962 Middlesbrough East by-election
 1962 Montgomeryshire by-election
 1962 Northern Ireland general election
 1962 Orpington by-election
 1962 Stockton-on-Tees by-election
 1962 West Lothian by-election

United Kingdom local

English local
 1962 Bermondsey Borough election
 1962 Southwark Borough election

North America

Canada
 1962 Canadian federal election
 1962 Edmonton municipal election
 1962 Manitoba general election
 1962 Newfoundland general election
 1962 Ottawa municipal election
 1962 Prince Edward Island general election
 1962 Quebec general election
 1962 Toronto municipal election

Caribbean
 1962 Jamaican general election

United States
 1962 United States elections
 United States House of Representatives elections in California, 1962
 1962 California gubernatorial election
 1962 Maine gubernatorial election
 1962 Massachusetts gubernatorial election
 1962 Minnesota gubernatorial election
 1962 New Orleans mayoral election
 1962 New York state election
 United States House of Representatives elections in South Carolina, 1962
 1962 South Carolina gubernatorial election
 1962 United States House of Representatives elections
 1962 United States Senate elections

United States gubernatorial
 1962 Oregon gubernatorial election

United States Senate
 1962 United States Senate elections
 United States Senate special election in Massachusetts, 1962
 United States Senate election in North Dakota, 1962
 United States Senate election in Oregon, 1962
 United States Senate election in South Carolina, 1962

South America 
 1962 Argentine legislative election
 1962 Salvadoran presidential election

Oceania

Australia
 1962 New South Wales state election
 1962 South Australian state election
 1962 Western Australian state election

See also

 
1962
Elections